KKRX (1380 AM) is a radio station broadcasting a sports format. Licensed to Lawton, Oklahoma, United States, the station serves the Lawton area. The station is currently owned by Mollman Media, Inc.

References

External links

KRX
Sports radio stations in the United States